Sir Samuel Instone (16 August 1878 – 9 November 1937) was a British shipping and aviation entrepreneur and the founder of the Instone Air Line.

Personal history
Instone was born in Gravesend, Kent, the eldest of three brothers born to Adolphe Instone and Maria Jacob. His father was born Adolphe Einstein in Fellheim, Bavaria, Germany. He was educated at Tunbridge Wells and in the French port city of Boulogne-sur-Mer, where he began his business career at age 15.

He came to Cardiff in Wales in 1908 to work for a shipping company as a manager. With his brother, Theodore Instone, he went into business as a coal factor in 1908, and in 1914 bought the ship, Collivaud from Morels. After World War I, the brothers owned ten vessels shipping coal from the South Wales valleys. It was during this period that Samuel diversified into coal mining with the acquisition of the Bedwas colliery. In 1919 Instone Air Line was set up by Samuel along with another brother Alfred, and started an air route from Cardiff to Paris. Due to the depression of the 1920s Samuel saw his shipping interests wane, and by 1925 the last of his ships were sold.

Instone was constantly at the front of commercial and technological trends within the aviation business. On 19 August 1920, Sir Samuel Instone had a telephone conversation from his home in London to a passenger on a flight destined for Paris. This call to a Vickers aeroplane is thought to be the first telephone call to an inflight aircraft. He also introduced uniforms for his flight crews, the first non-military air service to do so. In 1921 Samuel was knighted, and represented the Chamber of Shipping at Air Conferences in England and the International Chamber of Commerce at the League of Nations, Geneva.

He was also a Freeman of the City of London and Commander of the Belgian Order of Leopold.

Social enterprises
In 1922, Frank L. Barnard, chief pilot of Instone Air Line won the first King's Cup Race. Sir Instone took the trophy with him on a visit to Bedwas Colliery, and it was allowed to be displayed in a local shop's window.

As an act of public service, Samuel Instone and his brother Theodore once offered to hire Harry Grindell Matthews in order to keep his reported death ray in the United Kingdom.

Personal life
In 1910, Instone married Alice Maud Liebman and they had five daughters. He died unexpectedly in a London nursing home in 1937 following surgery, after being expected to make a good recovery. His memorial service was held at the West London Synagogue and he was buried at the Willesden Jewish Cemetery. His daughter Anna married Julian Herbage.

References

1878 births
1937 deaths
English Jews
People from Gravesend, Kent
British people of German-Jewish descent
English businesspeople
Knights Bachelor